The Concerto for Horn and Hardart, S. 27, is a work of Peter Schickele composing under the pseudonym P. D. Q. Bach. The work is a parody of the classical double concerto but where one instrument, the hardart, uses different devices, such as plucked strings, blown whistles and popped balloons, to produce each note in its range. The name "hardart" and the name of the concerto is a play on the name of proprietors Horn & Hardart, who pioneered the North American use of the automat. Like the automat, the hardart had small windows in the front where the musician had to insert coins to remove implements needed to strike or otherwise play the devices that produced the notes. The composer Philip Glass, a classmate of Schickele's, helped build the actual instrument; Glass and the others tasked with building the hardart made it a transposing instrument without telling Schickele. Although a parody, the work is a well-written example of a classical concerto and could stand as a serious piece of music with a few changes.

The piece is in three movements:

The first movement is in sonata form, though with numerous mishaps. It quotes Wolfgang Amadeus Mozart's Symphony No. 29. The second is a set of variations which, as Schickele notes, have no relationship to the initial theme. It quotes Piano Concerto No. 21 (Mozart). It concludes with a cadenza that shows off the abilities of the hardart. The third movement, a minuet ("with cream and sugar"), ends with the bursting of the balloons on the hardart.

The concert was released on Schickele's first album, Peter Schickele Presents an Evening with P. D. Q. Bach (1807–1742)? (1965), with Schickele playing the Hardart and Jorge Mester conducting.

A portion of the cadenza was sampled by the group Jurassic 5 in the song "Monkey Bars" on their album Quality Control.

The inscription Minor Labor Matris on the hardart is Latin for "Less Work for Mother", the advertising slogan adopted by Horn & Hardart in 1924.

References

External links
 Work details, schickele.com
 

P. D. Q. Bach
Musical parodies
Hadart